Anwara Begum (known as Anwara) is a Bangladeshi film actress. She has acted in more than 600 films as of 2015. She earned Bangladesh National Film Award for Lifetime Achievement (2020) from Bangladesh government. She won Bangladesh National Film Award for Best Supporting Actress seven times for her roles in Golapi Ekhon Traine (1978), Sundori (1979), Sokhinar Juddho (1984), Moroner Pore (1990), Radha Krishna (1992), Banglar Badhu (1993) and Ontore Ontore (1994), and Best Actress award once for Shuvoda (1986).

Career
In 1961, while Anwara was a student of seventh grade in Palasi Girls' School, she performed as a dancer in a group for the film Aajan. The film was never released. In 1963, Anwara acted as a dancer in two films Nachghor and Preeti Na Jane Reet. She then acted as a supporting actress in the film Sangam (1964). She performed as an actress in a lead role for Bala (1967). She got her breakthrough in 1967 for her Aleya role in the film Nawab Sirajuddaula.

Since 1972, Anwara started performing in roles of mothers, aunts and mother-in-laws.

Personal life
Anwara married to Muhitul Islam Muhit in 1972. Anwara has a daughter,  Rumana Islam Mukti.

Filmography

References

External links
 
 Anwara Begum at the Bangla Movie Database

Living people
People from Comilla
Bangladeshi television actresses
Bangladeshi film actresses
Actresses in Bengali cinema
Best Actress National Film Awards (Bangladesh) winners
Best Supporting Actress National Film Award (Bangladesh) winners
Best Supporting Actress Bachsas Award winners
1948 births
National Film Award (Bangladesh) for Lifetime Achievement recipients